Federal Laboratories (often FedLabs or Federal Labs) was a company that manufactured tear gas and less-lethal riot guns, including the popular Federal Riot Gun, based in Pittsburgh and established in the early part of the 20th century.

History of use

Civil order in the United States

In the 1930s, custom gas guns by FedLabs were adopted by the New York Prison department, following a sales pitch made before the APA by the president of FedLabs in Baltimore in 1931.

Also in the 1930s, Federal Laboratories actively worked to sell gas guns for the purpose of strikebreaking. One FedLabs representative fired a tear gas grenade during the 1934 West Coast waterfront strike that caused the death of a striker due to skull fracture. Auerbach notes, however, that despite FedLabs stated opposition to "communist" strikers, the firm continued to sell tear gas to the Soviet Union even during 1933.

World War II
During World War II, the company's factory near Saltsburg, PA along Tunnelton Road employed women to replace drafted male workers. There the women produced "incendiary magnesium powder bombs, grenades and other munitions", including FedLabs tear gas grenades.

Northern Ireland
The single shot FRG became the standard riot gun used extensively by the British Army throughout The Troubles in Northern Ireland.

Israel
FedLabs gas guns, and CS and CN grenades, were imported by Israel for use in the Palestinian Territories; in 1988 FedLabs discontinued sales of CS and CN to Israel following multiple reports of abusive use of the products.

Sale and fate
In March 1994, TransTechnology sold FedLabs to Mace Security International, which subsequently sold the company in 1998 to Armor Holdings. Armor holdings was in turn acquired by BAE Systems in 2007.

References

Firearm manufacturers of the United States
Non-lethal weapons